Mr. Nice Guy was a 1987 Canadian film starring Mike MacDonald and Jan Smithers. It is a mafia-themed comedy.

Plot
A mafia hitman is engaged to be married and his fiancée doesn't know his true profession while his future father-in-law has a contract out on him.

Cast
 Mike MacDonald as Kurt Murdoch
 Jan Smithers as Lise
 Joe Silver as Leser Tish
 Harvey Atkin as Jerry Reeman
 Howard Jerome as The Den
 Keith Knight as Larry
 Lou Pitoscia as Kurt's Chauffeur
 Dan MacDonald as Clemens 
 Micheal Donaghue as Catso
 Jack Newman as Salesman
 Maxine Miller as Lise's Mom
 Lillian Lewis as Tish's Receptionist
 Barbara Franklin as Tish's Wife
 Daniel Dicks as Tish's Grandson
 Aino Pirskanen as Kurt's Mom
 Jack Anthony as Kurt's Dad
 Bobbi Sherron as Clinic Receptionist
 Patrick Rose as Senator George Bigger
 Leonard Smofsky as Ray Marris
 Dick Grant as Prison Warden
 Dinah Mate as Catso's Mistress
 Dick Callahan as M.C.
 Pat Kelly as Mafia Goon #1
 Mike Kelly as Mafia Goon #2

References

External links
 

1987 films
1987 comedy films
Mafia comedy films
1980s American films